Gothawn is a town located in the Azamgarh district of Uttar Pradesh, India. It comes under the Martinganj subdistrict
There are three main religions Hinduism, Buddhism and Islam. International Buddhist Temple is the most important place here. It was founded by Venerable Chandrajeet Gautam.

This Village / Town is about 34 km from District Azamgarh headquarter.  In this Village / City have 14th Wards and about 10th Mohallas (Bhatpura, Dihawa, Kewatana, Rewariya, Purva, Bharauti, Mandyiya, Bakrabad, etc.).  This place is the main center of Buddhists of Eastern Uttar Pradesh.  At this place, Venerable Chandrajeet Gautam was born.  Here is a Buddhist Temple (International Buddhist Temple) founded by Venerable Chandrajeet Gautam.  Venerable Chandrajeet Gautam has done incredible work in the religious and social fields.  Because of the personal nature and loyal personality of Chandrajeet Gautam, many foreigners also come here, for example Buddhists, worshipers of Verma, Thailand, Sri Lanka and Korea etc. have given their dignified presence.  On this place, the work of burning the light of education was done by Subedar Singh Ji.  At first, he opened the door of education for the untouchables here.  Due to this work some people burnt their house even after you did not move back.  Mr. Satyanarayan Singh Ji and Mr. Rajnarayan Singh ji also made special contributions to education.  The name of Ram Prakash Yadav of this region is immortalized in the form of a famous doctor and social worker as well as the name of Freedom Fighter Ram Palat Yadav.  His son, Dr. Sunil Kumar Yadav is also working as a social worker with a famous doctor.  The village heads have a special contribution in the development of this area.  Special contribution to the electrification of this region was former chief Laljit Rajbhar Ji.

Temples & Mosques 
 International Buddhist Temple
 Jogibeer Baba Temple
 Baba Prahladdaas Temple
 Budhiya Maai Temple
 Burhau Baba Temple
 Gothawn Mosque (Usra)

Organizations 
 The Dhamma Global Foundation (TDGF)
 Buddhayaan Bheem Jyoti Samiti

Schools 
 Girls Primary School Gothawn
 Primary School Gothawn
 Junior High School Gothawn
 Vishal Gyan Deep Inter College
 Uday Smarak Inter College
 Buddhist Cultural School

Hospitals 
 Primary Helth Center (Women's Hospital)

Notable people 
 Ram Prakash Yadav (Freedom Fighter)
 Subedhar Singh
 Rajnarayan Singh
 Satyanarayan Singh
 Chandrajeet Gautam
 Ashok Pathak
 Vedprakash Singh (Bechan Singh)
 Ram Pratap Singh (Ramu Singh)
 Anil Kumar Yadav

List of Village Heads
Name with period
 Shri Janardan Singh (1950-1972)
 Shri Medhayi Rajbhar (1972-1990)
 Shri Laljit Rajbhar (1990-1995)
 Smt. Dharma Devi Rajbhar (1995-2000)
 Smt. Prabhavati Pathak (2000-2005)
 Mr.(Rizwan) (2005-2010)
 Smt. Durgavati Bind (2010-2015)
 Smt. Pushpa Pathak (2015–2021)
 Smt. Punam Yadav (2021–present)

Census 2011 data

References

Cities and towns in Azamgarh district